"Please" is a debut song written by Tony Haselden, and recorded by American country music duo The Kinleys. It was released in July 1997 as the first single from their debut album Just Between You and Me. The song reached #7 on the Billboard Hot Country Singles & Tracks chart and #67 on the Billboard Hot 100.

Later in the year, Epic also released an acoustic version of the song.

Music video
The music video was directed by Chris Rogers and premiered in August 1997.

Chart performance
"Please" debuted at number 68 on the U.S. Billboard Hot Country Singles & Tracks for the week of August 2, 1997.

References

1997 songs
1997 debut singles
The Kinleys songs
Epic Records singles
Songs written by Tony Haselden